Innis Green (February 26, 1776August 4, 1839) was a Jacksonian Democratic member of the U.S. House of Representatives from Pennsylvania.

Biography
Innis Green was born in Hanover Township, Province of Pennsylvania.  He pursued an academic course, studied law, and was admitted to the bar and practiced.  He was appointed associate judge of Dauphin County, Pennsylvania, by Governor William Findlay in 1818, and resigned October 23, 1827.

Green was elected to the Twentieth Congress and reelected as a Jacksonian to the Twenty-first Congress.  After his time in Congress, he was reappointed associate judge of Dauphin County and served until his death in Dauphin, Pennsylvania, in 1839.  Interment was in Dauphin Cemetery.

Sources

The Political Graveyard

1776 births
1839 deaths
Pennsylvania lawyers
Pennsylvania state court judges
People from Dauphin County, Pennsylvania
Politicians from Harrisburg, Pennsylvania
Jacksonian members of the United States House of Representatives from Pennsylvania
19th-century American politicians